Zheng Wei (born 4 September 1963) is a Chinese basketball coach and former player. She is the current head coach of the Chinese national team. She won the silver medal at FIBA Women's Basketball World Cup as both player and coach.

Player career
Zheng spent her player career with PLA-affliliated teams. She started her career in 1979, playing for Wuhan Military team. In 1985 when the team were disbanded, she joined Bayi.

She represented China in the 1994 FIBA World Championship for Women, and won a silver medal.

She decided to retire in 1998 due to injuries.

Coach career
After her retirement, Zheng entered Guangdong Kapok. She became head coach of the team in 1999. After professionalization, she and the team aqcuired WCBA's runner-up in 2003.

In 2008, she stepped down and served as the assistant coach of the team until 2020.

In 2020, she moved north to join the Inner Mongolia Rural Credit Union team as part of a quite controversial project to support the newly established team. She won the WCBA title twice with the team.

National team career 
Since 2009, she worked as assistant coach for Chinese national team.

In 2022, following Xu Limin's resignation, Zheng became the head coach of the national team. She was able to make historical breakthrough by winning the silver medal again at the 2022 FIBA Women's Basketball World Cup.

References

Chinese women's basketball coaches
Living people
Olympic coaches
1963 births
Sportspeople from Wuhan
Basketball players from Hubei
Chinese women's basketball players
Basketball players at the 1990 Asian Games
Basketball players at the 1994 Asian Games
Asian Games medalists in basketball
Asian Games silver medalists for China
Asian Games bronze medalists for China
Medalists at the 1990 Asian Games
Medalists at the 1994 Asian Games
Basketball coaches of international teams
Bayi Kylin players